Tam, de nas nema (Wherever We Aren't) is the debut studio album of the popular Ukrainian rock group Okean Elzy. Svyatoslav Vakarchuk is the lead vocalist and main lyricist on this record. It was released in 1998 by the Kyiv-based record label Lavina Music.

Meaning
The term "Tam de nas nema" is a reference to a Ukrainian proverb:  Translation – It's good where we aren't. In English, a similar proverb is, "The grass is always greener on the other side."

Track listing
All lyrics by Sviatoslav Vakarchuk.  Music by Okean Elzy.
 Novyi den (2:48) - (Translation: New Day)
 Tam, de nas nema (3:29) - (Там, де нас нема; There, Where We Are Not)
 Holos tviy (3:54) - (Голос твій; Your voice)
 Pozych meni sontse (4:06) - (Позич мені сонце; Lend Me the Sun)
 Taj-Mahal (3:22) - (Тадж-Махал)
 Sumna melodiya (4:17) - (Сумна мелодія; Sad Melody)
 Poyizd «Chuzha Liubov» (3:59) - (Поїзд "Чужа любов"; Train "Others' Love")
 Ydu na dno (3:34) - (Йду на дно; Going to the Bottom)
 Visim (3:30) - (Вісім, Eight)
 Lastivka z moho mista (3:04) - (Ластівка з мого міста; A Swallow from my City)
 Ty zabula davno (4:38) - (Ти забула давно; You Forgot Long Ago)
 Long Time Ago (3:47)
 Kolyska vitru (3:05) - (Колиска вітру; Cradle of the Wind)
 Hodi vzhe (4:29) - (Годі вже; Enough Already)
 Tam, de nas nema (remix) (4:07)

Personnel

Okean Elzy
Sviatoslav Vakarchuk: Vocals
Pavlo Hudimov: Guitars
Yuriy Khustochka: Bass
Denys Hlinin: Drums

Additional personnel
Roman Surzha: Keyboards (tracks 3, 5-7 and 12)
Edik Kosca: Tambourine (track 2)

External links
Album Tam, de nas nema on the band's official website
Official Lavina Music website

1998 debut albums
Okean Elzy albums
Ukrainian-language albums